OMG... We're in a Horror Movie!!! is a 2015 American comedy horror film directed by Ajala Bandele.  It stars Brendan McGowan, Sharon Mae Wang, Nils Jansson, Chris Hampton, Bandele, Shanna Malcolm, and Liz Fenning as friends who realize they have suddenly been transported into a horror film.  It premiered at the Hollywood Reel Independent Film Festival in February 2015 and was released on video-on-demand in January 2016.

Plot 
While playing a board game, several friends find themselves transported into a horror movie.  They are forced to assume the roles of stereotypical horror film characters, including one who must become the killer.

Cast 
 Brendan McGowan as Tom
 Sharon Mae Wang as Jesse
 Nils Jansson as Kyle
 Chris Hampton as Chris
 Ajala Bandele as AJ
 Shanna Malcolm as Tanya
 Liz Fenning as Amy

Production 
Director and co-writer Ajala Bendele said that writing the story came first, and the jokes flowed from that.  Bendele was inspired by Scream, Scary Movie, The Cabin in the Woods, and The Truman Show.  He wrote the part of AJ for himself after experiencing frustration with his acting career.  The other parts were similarly written for his friends.

Release 
OMG... We're in a Horror Movie!!! premiered at the Hollywood Reel Independent Film Festival on February 21, 2015.  Leomark Studios released it on video-on-demand in January 2016.

Reception 
Matt Boiselle of Dread Central rated it 3/5 stars and called the film "fairly entertaining", though he said the humor may be offensive to some viewers.  Joel Harley of Starburst rated it 3/10 stars and wrote that despite the cast and crew's obvious enthusiasm for the film, it is too inept and unfunny to enjoy.  Mark L. Miller of Ain't It Cool News positively compared it to the Scary Movie film series and called it a "clever and fun" film that suffers from poor pacing.

References

External links 
 

2015 films
2015 horror films
American comedy horror films
American parody films
2010s English-language films
Self-reflexive films
Parodies of horror
2010s American films